Murat Ansorbiyevich Khotov (born 2 June 1987) is a Russian professional football player. He plays for Dnepr Smolensk.

External links
 
 

1987 births
Living people
Russian footballers
Sportspeople from Smolensk Oblast
Association football forwards
Russian expatriate footballers
Expatriate footballers in Belarus
Belarusian Premier League players
FC Avangard Kursk players
FC Petrotrest players
FC Naftan Novopolotsk players
FC Dnepr Mogilev players
FC Slutsk players
FC Gomel players